PNSC may refer to:

Pakistan National Shipping Corporation
Supreme Court of the Pitcairn Islands
Portsmouth Northsea Swimming Club
Paróquia Nossa Senhora da Conceição